Avraham Even-Shoshan (né Rozenshteyn; 25 December 1906 – 8 August 1984) was a Belarusian-born Israeli Hebrew linguist and lexicographer, compiler of the Even-Shoshan dictionary, one of the foremost dictionaries of the Hebrew language.

Biography
Avraham Rozenshteyn was born in Minsk, in what was then the Russian Empire, on 25 December 1906. He attended the cheder run by his father, who later sent him to public school and yeshiva.

Rosenstein managed to avoid the British restrictions on Jewish immigration to Mandatory Palestine and settled there in 1925, where he changed his name to Even-Shoshan, a translation of Rosenstein, and initially worked as a laborer. He studied at the College for Hebrew Teachers (now the David Yellin College of Education) in Jerusalem and the Hebrew University of Jerusalem. He worked as a teacher in Jerusalem until 1967.

In 1946–58, Even-Shoshan compiled HaMilon HeHadash (New Dictionary of the Hebrew Language), which since 2003 has become known as the Even-Shoshan Dictionary. The completed dictionary consisted of 24,698 main entries and about 70,000 words, and is still in print. It includes synonyms in Arabic, Aramaic, Akkadian, and Ugaritic. He was also the author of the Even-Shoshan concordance and co-author of the Bialik concordance.

Even-Shoshan died in the Hadassah Medical Center in Jerusalem in 1984. He was buried in the Har HaMenuchot.

Awards 
 In 1978, Even-Shoshan was awarded the Israel Prize, for language.
 In 1981, he was the co-recipient (jointly with Zev Vilnay) of the Bialik Prize for Jewish thought.

Published works
 A New Concordance of the Bible: Thesaurus of the Language of the Bible, Hebrew and Aramaic, Roots, Words, Proper Names Phrases and Synonyms (1984)

See also 
List of Israel Prize recipients
List of Bialik Prize recipients

Notes

References 

Linguists from Israel
Israeli lexicographers
20th-century Israeli Jews
1906 births
1984 deaths
Israel Prize in linguistics recipients
20th-century linguists
20th-century lexicographers
Soviet emigrants to Mandatory Palestine